Neoclassical finance is an approach within finance, developing since the mid-1960s, which holds that markets are efficient, and that prices will thus tend to equilibrium and be "rational";
and asset pricing models must then reflect these.
It may be contrasted with, for example, behavioral finance which is based on differing, less idealized, assumptions regarding markets and investors.
It built on earlier developments such as the Austrian School of economics,  and cross-fertilized with atomic physics (see state price) and other heavily quantitative disciplines.

See also
 Financial economics and particularly, #Arbitrage-free pricing and equilibrium
 Neoclassical economics
 Fundamental theorem of asset pricing
 Modern portfolio theory
 Post-modern portfolio theory
 Stephen Ross

References

Neoclassical Finance; Stephen A. Ross at press.princeton.edu

Financial economics